Carroll Township is the name of some places in the U.S. state of Pennsylvania:
 Carroll Township, Perry County, Pennsylvania
 Carroll Township, Washington County, Pennsylvania
 Carroll Township, York County, Pennsylvania

See also 
 East Carroll Township, Cambria County, Pennsylvania
 West Carroll Township, Cambria County, Pennsylvania

Pennsylvania township disambiguation pages